Actinostemma is a genus of flowering plants in the gourd family Cucurbitaceae, native to east Asia. They are slender, weakly twining/climbing annual herbs.

Species
Currently accepted species include:

Actinostemma lobatum (Maxim.) Maxim. ex Franch. & Sav.
Actinostemma tenerum Griff.

References

Cucurbitaceae
Cucurbitaceae genera